Kais Zayadin (born 1984) is a Jordanian politician who currently serves as a Representative in the Jordanian Parliament. He was elected in 2016 on a secular list, Ma'an list.

References

Members of the House of Representatives (Jordan)
1984 births
Living people